Artix may refer to:

 Artix, Ariège, a commune in France
 Artix, Pyrénées-Atlantiques, a commune in France
 Artix ESB, software product of IONA Technologies
 Artix Entertainment, an independent video game developer
Artix Linux, a Linux distribution